Wangjiang County is a county in the southwest of Anhui Province, situated on the northwest (left) bank of the Yangtze. It is under the jurisdiction of the prefecture-level city of Anqing. The ZIP code of Wangjiang is 246200.The government of Wangjiang County is located in Leiyang Town.

Administrative divisions
Wangjiang County has jurisdiction over eight towns and two townships.

Towns
Huayang, Saikou, Yatan, Changling Town, Taici, Zhanghu, Gaoshi, Yangwan
Townships:
 Leichi Township, Liangquan Township

Climate

References

County-level divisions of Anhui
Anqing